Hechuan is a district in the northern part of Chongqing Municipality, People's Republic of China, located at the meeting point of the Jialing, Fu and Qu rivers, with a history of 1,500 years.

Hechuan was formerly a county-level city but was incorporated into Chongqing as a district in 2006.

Administration

Climate

References

2006 establishments in China
Districts of Chongqing
Former cities in China